Mt. Olivet Methodist Church is a historic church in Lancaster, Kentucky. It was built in 1886 and added to the National Register of Historic Places in 1985.

It is Italianate in style.  Brackets supporting overhanging eaves of its gable roof.  It has round-arched stained glass windows.

The current pastor is Darin Gary. It donates to the United Methodist Children's Home frequently.

References

Churches in Garrard County, Kentucky
Lancaster, Kentucky
Methodist churches in Kentucky
Churches on the National Register of Historic Places in Kentucky
Italianate architecture in Kentucky
Churches completed in 1886
19th-century Methodist church buildings in the United States
National Register of Historic Places in Garrard County, Kentucky
Italianate church buildings in the United States
1886 establishments in Kentucky